Hexanitrodiphenylamine (abbreviated HND), is an explosive chemical compound with the formula C12H5N7O12.  HND was used extensively by the Japanese during World War II but was discontinued due to its toxicity.

Preparation
Dinitrodiphenylamine is treated with 98% nitric acid. The starting material, dinitrodiphenylamine, is obtained from the reaction of aniline, dinitrochlorobenzene, and soda ash.

Applications
HND is a booster-class explosive that was used in World War II by the Germans as a component of Hexanite (60% TNT - 40% HND) and by the Japanese as a component of Kongo (Type 98 H2) (60% Trinitroanisole - 40% HND) for use in bombs, sea mines and depth charges; Seigate (Type 97 H) (60% TNT - 40% HND) for use in torpedo warheads and depth charges; and also in Otsu-B (60% TNT, 24% HND & 16% aluminium powder) for use in torpedo warheads.

Its ammonium salt, also known as Aurantia or Imperial Yellow, was discovered in 1873 by Emil Kopp and used as a yellow colorant for leather, wool and silk in the 19th and early 20th centuries.

Safety and toxicity
A most toxic and poisonous explosive, it attacks the skin, causing blisters which resemble burns. Dust from HND is injurious to the mucous membranes of the mouth, nose, and lungs. Several nitroaromatic explosives, including HND, have been found to be mutagens.

Incidents
On 12 May 2022, construction of the Bundesautobahn 49 in Germany was halted, after traces of the explosive were found in the excavated material. The road passes over a former explosives factory near Stadtallendorf. The factory had been demolished after World War II, and it was not expected that traces of explosives had remained in the ground.

References

See also

 Hexanite

Explosive chemicals
Nitrobenzenes
Anilines